TNPL may refer to:

 Tamil Nadu Newsprint and Papers Limited, a paper company based in Chennai, India
 Tamil Nadu Premier League, T20 cricket league played in Tamil Nadu, India
 TNPL Pugalur, a panchayat town in Karur district in the Indian state of Tamil Nadu